Turau (feminine-language: Turava) is a Belarusian-language surname. It may also be transliterated from Belarusian as Turaŭ or Turaw.

The surname may refer to:

 Turov (surname), Russian-language form; may be used interchangeably with the Belarusian form for Belarusian persons
Ryta Turava, Belarusian athlete, competing in race walking
Alesia Turava, Belarusian athlete, middle distance runner

See also
Turow (disambiguation)

Belarusian-language surnames